Hebei Airlines (河北航空公司 Héběi Hángkōng gōngsī) is a Chinese airline which has its corporate headquarters in the Shijiazhuang World Trade Plaza Hotel (S: 石家庄世贸广场酒店, T: 石家莊世貿廣場酒店, P: Shíjiāzhuāng Shìmào Guǎngchǎng Jiǔdiàn) in Chang'an District, Shijiazhuang, Hebei Province.

History
The airline was formerly known as Northeast Airlines; it re-branded itself as Hebei Airlines in 2010. It commenced operation on June 29, 2010.

Destinations

As of March 2017, Hebei Airlines serves 27 destinations in China. The airline's debut international flight was on 27 March 2017 with 3 weekly service to Bangkok–Suvarnabhumi.

On 29 October 2017, the airline launched flights to Singapore.

Fleet
, Hebei Airlines fleet consists of the following aircraft:

Former fleet

References

External links

Airlines of China
XiamenAir
Transport in Hebei
Companies based in Hebei
Government-owned companies of China
Airlines established in 2010
Chinese companies established in 2010
China Southern Airlines
Chinese brands